Viktor Polášek (born 18 July 1997) is a Czech ski jumper. He competed in two events at the 2018 Winter Olympics.

References

External links
 

1997 births
Living people
Czech male ski jumpers
Olympic ski jumpers of the Czech Republic
Ski jumpers at the 2018 Winter Olympics
Ski jumpers at the 2022 Winter Olympics
People from Nové Město na Moravě
Sportspeople from the Vysočina Region